The Stratheden Group is a Devonian lithostratigraphic group (a sequence of  rock strata) in southern Scotland and northernmost England. Occasionally pebbly, this red-brown and yellow sandstone dominated unit also contains siltstones and mudstones. It is encountered in Arran in the west and across the Midland Valley to the northeastern parts of Fife in the east. The name is derived from Stratheden in Fife. The rocks of the Stratheden Group have also previously been referred to as the Upper Old Red Sandstone. It unconformably overlies a variety of other rock sequences including the Strathmore Group around Dumbarton, Stirling and Arran and the Arbuthnott-Garvock Group in Fife and the Kinross area.

References

 

Silurian System of Europe
Geology of England
Geology of Scotland
Geological groups of the United Kingdom
Geologic formations of the United Kingdom